Louis Edward Bradbury (1863 – 7 July 1950) was a British philatelist who signed the Roll of Distinguished Philatelists in 1929. He was a specialist in the stamps of Bahamas and Nevis and his Nevis research led to the discovery of the original printing plates.

References

Signatories to the Roll of Distinguished Philatelists
1863 births
1950 deaths
British philatelists